Allein gegen die Zeit (Alone Against Time) is a German real-time television series, aired since 2010. Broadcast on KI.KA, structurally, it resembles the American TV series 24. It was followed in 2016 by a special TV movie.

Plot

Season 1
The Teenagers Ben, Leo, Jonas, Sophie and Özzi have a detention on a Saturday morning. When their teacher Mr. Funke, Ben's father, leaves the classroom and does not return, the five children go and look for him. While passing another classroom, they realise that a group of criminals took the whole astronomy set hostage. Immediately the five students want to run away to get help, but all exits are blocked. Soon they realise that the gangsters seek to get hold of the "nanotron", which was designed by Mr. Funke to heal cancer. Mr. Funke turns out to be in fact a Professor with the last name Brehmer. Rather than healing, the criminals plan an attack on the heads of state of all European countries, this is possible because the "nanotron" is a device that controls little robots called "nanobots", these can not only destroy cancer cells but also they allow the owner of the "nanotron" to control the mind of his victim. The five children as well as two policemen, the streetgang of Özzi's brother and Sophie's mother manage to interfere the gangsters plan and save Europe from being ruled by an authoritarian ruler. The pupils act in an extraordinary way: Özzi is the technology freak – he hacks computers and builds machines; Sophie is the science genius – she manages to produce an antidote for the "nanobots"; Leo is a martial arts expert; Ben is the primary target of the villains as he is the professor's son, also he is the first person, whose mind gets controlled; Jonas is the show-off in the group, but in the end he proves his courage and loyalty, this saves all the kids in the end.

Season 2
In season 2, the five teenagers are on a trip to a lake. Upon arriving there, they are watched by a group of military-like behaving people. When these people kidnap Ben, the others look for him in the forest. They meet up with a dying man. He tells them that if the villains succeed, thousands will die, then he dies himself. Later the 4 pupils find a former GDR military base. They manage to get in, and slowly they begin to uncover the mystery: the villains have added a toxin to about 350 flowers, these flowers are kept in a vacuum, 2 minutes after leaving it they spray the toxic everybody who gets in touch with it dies within 3 hours, however Sophie finds out that a bee sting from a local bee is an antidote. Again the teenagers manage to defeat the villains step by step. The villains this time are led by Alexandre Legard, a terrorist suffering from a light allergy. Legard plans to take revenge on the German government because they destroyed his terror unit 2 years ago. During the season it is revealed that Ben's mother, who was believed to be dead for 2 years, is still alive and also taken hostage by Legard, which is why Ben had been kidnapped. After an exciting showdown the children and their friends stop the contamination of more people and Ben's mother returns home.

Cast and characters

Main characters

Supporting characters

Episodes

Season 1: 2010

Season 2: 2011-2012

References

External links
 
 Official website 

2010 German television series debuts
German-language television shows
Television series about teenagers